Alfred Scopp (15 September 1919 – 24 July 2021) was a Canadian actor who worked mostly in television series, including as a voice actor. He also worked in theatre, radio, and films. He was part of the voice cast for the 1964 Christmas special Rudolph the Red-Nosed Reindeer. Scopp was the longest-lived and one of the last surviving cast members of the special.

Life and career
Scopp was born on 15 September 1919 in London, England, to a Russian-Jewish father and an English mother. As a child, he and his family emigrated to Montreal, Canada. During World War II, he was part of the Royal Canadian Air Force in Newfoundland. It was during this time that he began a career in radio, working for the local station CBG (AM). In theatre, he worked in different Toronto productions, as well as working for National Film Board of Canada. He attended Lorne Greene Academy of Radio Arts after the war, along with Leslie Nielsen, Gordie Tapp and Fred Davis.

He provided the voice of Socrates the Strawman in the 1960s animated television series Tales of the Wizard of Oz (1961) as well as the TV film Return to Oz (1964). He played the character role of bookseller Avram in the 1971 film Fiddler on the Roof, which won three Academy Awards and was nominated in seven more categories in 1972.

Scopp died in Toronto on 24 July 2021, at the age of 101.

Filmography

Film

Television

References

External links

1919 births
2021 deaths
20th-century Canadian male actors
Canadian centenarians
Canadian male film actors
Canadian male radio actors
Canadian male television actors
Canadian male voice actors
Canadian people of English descent
Canadian people of Russian-Jewish descent
English emigrants to Canada
Jewish Canadian male actors
Men centenarians
Male actors from London
Royal Canadian Air Force personnel of World War II